Ivana Karaja (born 1978, Berlin) is a German dance and pop musician.

Her 2002 single, "She Moves (La La La)", was a major success worldwide. The track peaked at No. 42 in the UK Singles Chart in October that year, where she was billed simply as Karaja.

References

External links
www.discogs.com Profile on discogs.com
www.last.fm Profile on last.fm

German dance musicians
1978 births
Living people
21st-century German women singers
Singers from Berlin